The 1954 U.S. Open was the 54th U.S. Open, held June 17–19 at Baltusrol Golf Club in Springfield, New Jersey, west of New York City. On the Lower Course, Ed Furgol won his only major title, one stroke ahead of runner-up Gene Littler.

Littler owned the 36-hole lead by two strokes over defending champion Ben Hogan and Furgol. After a 76 in the third round, Littler fell three strokes back of Furgol, who shot a 71 to take a one-stroke lead over Dick Mayer. Hogan made four bogeys at the first six holes and fell out of contention with a 76.

In the final round on Saturday afternoon, Littler rebounded with a 70, but it was not enough. Furgol was helped by a great recovery on the 18th. After hitting his drive into the trees, he played his escape shot onto the 18th fairway of Baltusrol's other course. From there he managed to make par, carding a 72 for a 284 total. Mayer was tied with Furgol as he played 18, but he double-bogeyed the hole to fall into third.

This U.S. Open was the first to be nationally televised, one hour of the final round, carried by NBC. It was also the first in which ropes were used to control the gallery, and prize money was increased by 20% over the previous year. This was the fourth U.S. Open at Baltusrol, but the first on the Lower Course, which later hosted in 1967, 1980, and 1993.

Course layout

Lower Course

Source:

Lengths of the courses for previous major championships at Baltusrol:
, par 72 - 1936 U.S. Open (Upper Course)
, par 74 - 1915 U.S. Open (Old Course)   The Old Course was plowed under in 1918
, par      - 1903 U.S. Open (Old Course)

Past champions in the field

Made the cut

Missed the cut 

Source:

Round summaries

First round
Thursday, June 17, 1954

Source:

Second round
Friday, June 18, 1954

Source:

Third round

Saturday, June 19, 1954 (morning)

Source:

Final round
Saturday, June 19, 1954 (afternoon)

Source:
(a) denotes amateur

References

External links
USOpen.com - 1954

U.S. Open (golf)
Golf in New Jersey
Springfield Township, Union County, New Jersey
U.S. Open
U.S. Open
U.S. Open golf
U.S. Open golf